James Henry Bonella (17 December 1884 – 24 May 1918) was an Australian rules footballer who played with Melbourne in the Victorian Football League (VFL), under the name of Jim Bonelli.

He died of gunshot wounds received whilst on active service in France during World War I.

Family
The son of Pietro Egidio "Peter" Bonelli (1844–1888), and Margaret Bonelli (1850-1928), née Williams, James Henry Bonelli, also known as Bonella, was born at Maldon, Victoria on 17 December 1884. 

He married Eliza Puncher (1885–1968) in 1912. They had one son, James Avenel Bonella (1913–2002).

Eliza's brother, Jim's brother-in-law, Private Joseph Samuel Puncher (also known as James Samuel Puncher) was killed in action in France on 21 November 1916.

Footballer
Recruited from Pembroke, he played one senior match for the Melbourne Football Club, in the last match of the season, on a very muddy ground, against Fitzroy, at the Brunswick Street Oval on 5 September 1908.

There had been a two-week break between rounds 17 and 18 due to the 1908 Melbourne Carnival. Melbourne's Dick Fowler, recruited from Caulfield Grammar School, and Fitzroy's Tom Norton, recruited from Hawthorn, also played their first and only senior VFL matches on that day.

He returned to Pembroke, and played for them in 1909.

Military service
Working as a picture-framer, he enlisted in the First AIF on 18 January 1915.

Embarking from Melbourne, Victoria, on HMAT Ulysses (A38) on 10 May 1915, he served overseas as a private in the 2nd Battalion, Australian Machine Gun Corps.

He was on the HMAT Southland when it was torpedoed on the Aegean Sea on 2 September 1915.

Death
He was severely wounded in his left thigh, whilst in action with the 21st Battalion, A Company, on 20 May 1918 and was evacuated to a military hospital. Although he had been successfully operated upon on 21 May 1918, he died of his wounds on 24 May 1918.

He is buried in section LXVIII, row D, grave 11 of Étaples Military Cemetery in northwest France.

See also
 List of Victorian Football League players who died in active service

Notes

References
 World War One Embarkation Roll: Private James Henry Bonella (98), collection of the Australian War Memorial. 
 World War One Nominal Roll: Private James Henry Bonella (98), collection of the Australian War Memorial. 
 World War One Service Record: Private James Henry Bonella (98), Australian National Archives.
 Red Cross Wounded and Missing Records: Private James Henry Bonella (98), collection of the Australian War Memorial.
 Roll of Honour Circular: Private James Henry Bonella (98), collection of the Australian War Memorial. 
 Roll of Honour: Private James Henry Bonella (98), Australian War Memorial. 
 Australian Casualties: Victorian List No.409, Died of Wounds – (Bonella, J.M, West Brunswick, 24/5/18), The Argus, (Monday, 17 June 1918), p.7.
 James Henry Bonella (98), The AIF Project, UNSW Canberra.

External links
 
 
 Jim Bonelli at Demonwiki

1884 births
1918 deaths
Military personnel from Victoria (Australia)
Melbourne Football Club players
Australian military personnel killed in World War I
Australian rules footballers from Victoria (Australia)
People from Maldon, Victoria
Burials at Étaples Military Cemetery